Air Marshal Sir Francis Joseph Fressanges,  (27 February 1902 – 17 October 1975) was a senior Royal Air Force officer who served as Air Officer Commanding-in-Chief at Far East Air Force from 1954 to 1957.

RAF career
Fressanges joined the Royal Air Force (RAF) as a cadet in 1921. He served with No. 28 Squadron during North West Frontier operations. He was appointed Officer Commanding No. 84 Squadron in 1935 and then became a Staff Officer in the Directorate of Training at the Air Ministry. He served in the Second World War as Officer Commanding No. 210 Squadron and then as Officer Commanding No. 95 Squadron before becoming deputy director and then Director of Overseas Operations at the Air Ministry. He completed his war service as Air Officer Commanding No. 47 Group.

After the war Fressanges was appointed Director of Operations at the Air Ministry and then Air Officer Commanding British Forces Aden before taking over as Assistant Chief of the Air Staff (Intelligence) at the Air Ministry in 1952. He became Air Officer Commanding-in-Chief at Far East Air Force in 1954 and retired in 1957.

Death
He died in October 1975.

References

|-

|-

1902 births
1975 deaths
Companions of the Order of the Bath
Knights Commander of the Order of the British Empire
Legionnaires of the Legion of Merit
Royal Air Force air marshals
Royal Air Force personnel of World War II